The 2011 International German Open (also known as the bet–at–home Open – German Tennis Championships 2011 for sponsorship reasons) was a men's tennis tournament played on outdoor red clay courts. It was the 105th edition of the event known that year as the International German Open and was part of the ATP World Tour 500 series of the 2011 ATP World Tour. It took place at the Am Rothenbaum in Hamburg, Germany, from 18 July through 24 July 2011.

Singles main draw entrants

Seeds

*Seedings based on the July 12, 2011 rankings.

Other entrants
The following players received wildcards into the singles main draw:
  Andreas Beck
  Tobias Kamke
  Julian Reister
  Cedrik-Marcel Stebe

The following players received entry from the qualifying draw:

  Simone Bolelli
  Victor Crivoi
  Marsel İlhan
  Bastian Knittel
  Guillermo Olaso
  Albert Ramos

The following players received entry from a lucky loser spot:
  Lukáš Rosol

Champions

Singles

 Gilles Simon defeated  Nicolás Almagro, 6–4, 4–6, 6–4.
It was Simon's second title of the year and ninth of his career.

Doubles

 Oliver Marach /  Alexander Peya defeated  František Čermák /  Filip Polášek, 6–4, 6–1.

References

External links
  
   
 Association of Tennis Professionals (ATP) tournament profile

 
International German Open
Hamburg European Open
July 2011 sports events in Germany
2011 in German tennis